This is a list of notable synagogues in Turkey.

Istanbul

Izmir

 Kemeraltı synagogues (list)
Algazi Synagogue
 Ashkenazi Synagogue
Aydınlı Shalom Synagogue
Bet Israel Synagogue (İzmir)
Beit-Hillel
Bikurkholim Synagogue
Etz-Hayyim Synagogue
Los Foresteros Synagogue
Hevra Synagogue
Kahal Kadosh Synagogue
Portugal Synagogue
Rosh-Ha-Ar Synagogue
Shaar Hashamayim Synagogue (İzmir)
Signora Giveret Synagogue

Adana
 Adana Synagogue

Ankara
 Ankara Synagogue

Bursa
Gerush Synagogue
Etz Ahayim Synagogue (Bursa)
Mayor Synagogue (Bursa)

Çanakkale
Çanakkale Synagogue

Edirne
 Edirne Synagogue

Gaziantep
Gaziantep Synagogue in Gaziantep

Kilis
Kilis Synagogue in Kilis

Hatay
Antakya Synagogue in Hatay
Iskenderun Synagogue in Hatay

Manisa
Sardis Synagogue

See also
 History of the Jews in Turkey
 Dönmeh
 Jewish Museum of Turkey
 Israel–Turkey relations
 Ishak Haleva
 Religion in Turkey
 Pallache family

External links
 Shalom Newspaper - The main newspaper of the Jewish community of Turkey
 Chief Rabbinate of Turkey 

 
Synagogues
Turkey